PZP  may refer to:
 Movement for Changes, a political party in Montenegro
 Movement for Reversal (Pokret za preokret), a political party in Serbia
 Porcine zona pellucida, a source of antigens for immunocontraception
 Pregnancy zone protein, a human protein coded by the PZP gene